Sergio Casal and Emilio Sánchez were the two-time defending champions, but lost to Paul Haarhuis and Mark Koevermans in the semifinals.

Haarhuis and Koevermans went on to win the title, defeating Grant Connell and Patrick Galbraith in the finals, 6–4, 6–7, 7–6.

Seeds
The first four seeds received a bye into the second round.

Draw

Finals

Top half

Bottom half

References

External links
1993 Hamburg Masters Doubles Draw

Doubles